Cassie Dawin Campbell-Pascall  (born November 22, 1973) is a former Canadian ice hockey player and a current broadcaster for Sportsnet and ESPN. Born in Richmond Hill, Ontario, Campbell grew up in Brampton, Ontario, playing for the Brampton Canadettes. She was the captain of the Canadian women's ice hockey team during the 2002 Winter Olympics and led the team to a gold medal. The left winger took on the role of captain again in the 2006 Winter Olympics in Turin, Italy, and again successfully led her team to a gold medal with a 4 – 1 win over Sweden.

Cassie was also captain of the Calgary Oval X-Treme, a team in the Western Women's Hockey League. Campbell has also played for the Toronto Aeros and the Mississauga Chiefs.

Campbell has done modeling, and hosted women's hockey segments on TSN's hockey broadcasts. She attended high school at North Park Secondary School Brampton, and is an alumna of the University of Guelph, in Guelph, Ontario, Canada.

In honour of Campbell's success, the City of Brampton and Mayor Susan Fennell named a new Recreation Centre, the Cassie Campbell Community Centre, which officially opened in 2007. The Hockey Canada Board and Wayne Gretzky attended the unveiling.

Retirement from hockey
Campbell retired from competitive hockey on August 30, 2006. She then joined Hockey Night in Canada as a rinkside reporter, becoming (on October 14, 2006) the first woman to do colour commentary on a Hockey Night in Canada broadcast. She filled in when Harry Neale was snowed in at his home in Buffalo. 
She launched her own website in the spring of 2008, and is a spokesperson for Scotiabank. She appears at corporate events for Scotiabank and contributed to a blog on the Scotia Hockey Club website.

On November 22, 2009, Campbell ran a leg in the Vancouver 2010 Olympic Torch relay, through the town of Cavendish, Prince Edward Island.

On November 26, 2013, after Rogers Communications secured a $5.2 billion deal with the National Hockey League for 12 years, Campbell joined Sportsnet's broadcast team, in addition to her Hockey Night in Canada role.

During the 2010, 2014 Winter Olympics and 2018 Winter Olympics, Campbell provided colour commentary for women's hockey. She was inducted into the Ontario Sports Hall of Fame in 2012.

Prior to the 2018 Clarkson Cup finals, Campbell resigned from her role as a CWHL Governor. She also reported that she wanted to resign from the league in 2016, but stayed on at the request of the league. During the two years, her biggest involvement had been helping to secure sponsorships for the league.

At the 9th Canadian Screen Awards in 2021, Campbell won the award for Best Sports Analysis or Commentary.

Campbell later joined the NHL on ESPN, who will broadcast games for the first time in 17 years, as part of their new broadcast team for the 2021–22 season.

Interests
Campbell also works as a motivational speaker for Speakers Spotlight, The Lavin Agency and The Sweeney Agency.
Campbell is also the author of a book which was released in October 2007. The book is titled H.E.A.R.T., a book co-written with Lorna Schultz Nicholson.

Personal life
Campbell was born in Richmond Hill, Ontario and raised in Brampton, Ontario. She is related to Lucy Maud Montgomery, author of Anne of Green Gables.

Campbell is married to Brad Pascall, an assistant general manager of the NHL's Calgary Flames. She gave birth to her first child, Brooke Violet, on November 17, 2010.

In 2007, Campbell was inducted into the Canada Sports Hall of Fame, the same year as Doug Flutie. The June 2007 issue of Chatelaine magazine featured Campbell on its cover for the second time.

On June 16, 2011, Campbell received an honorary degree from the University of Guelph.

On June 25, 2012, Campbell received the Order of Hockey in Canada. She was presented with the Canadian Women's Hockey League Humanitarian of the Year Award in March 2014. The award was presented to Campbell by Canadian Prime Minister Stephen Harper. On June 30, 2016, Campbell was made a Member of the Order of Canada by Governor General David Johnston for "contributions to Canadian women's hockey as a player, broadcaster and role model."

The Cassie Campbell Community Centre in Brampton, Ontario is named in her honour.

During May 2018, Campbell-Pascall was part of a group of four female athletes, including Fran Rider, Jen Kish and Kerrin Lee-Gartner to publicly pledge their brain to a Canadian research centre. The posthumous donation shall be made to Toronto Western Hospital's Canadian Concussion Centre to further research on the effect of trauma on women's brains.

Career statistics
Career statistics are from Eliteprospects.com

Regular season

International

Awards and honours
1996 Guelph Sportswoman of the Year
2007 Canada Sports Hall of Fame Inductee (Campbell becomes the first female hockey player inducted into the Hall)
2008 A community centre is named after her in Brampton, Ontario. Cassie Campbell Community Centre
2012 Order of Hockey in Canada
2012 Ontario Sports Hall of Fame Member
2014 CWHL Humanitarian of the Year Award
2016 Member of the Order of Canada

References

External links
 
 Cassie Campbell - Women's Hockey #77 Defense 
 The Lavin Agency: Campbell profile
 Cassie Campbell - Profile on Speakers Spotlight
 Cassie Campbell Community Centre
 Cassie Campbell bio at The Sweeney Agency (speakers bureau)

1973 births
Living people
Calgary Oval X-Treme players
Canadian motivational speakers
Canadian television sportscasters
Canadian women's ice hockey left wingers
Ice hockey people from Ontario
Ice hockey players at the 1998 Winter Olympics
Ice hockey players at the 2002 Winter Olympics
Ice hockey players at the 2006 Winter Olympics
Medalists at the 1998 Winter Olympics
Medalists at the 2002 Winter Olympics
Medalists at the 2006 Winter Olympics
Members of the Order of Canada
National Hockey League broadcasters
Olympic gold medalists for Canada
Olympic ice hockey players of Canada
Olympic medalists in ice hockey
Olympic silver medalists for Canada
Ontario University Athletics ice hockey players
Order of Hockey in Canada recipients
Sportspeople from Brampton
Sportspeople from Richmond Hill, Ontario
University of Guelph alumni
Women sports announcers
Canadian women television personalities
Canadian Screen Award winners